Michael Alan Newton-Parry (born 29 December 1954) is an English journalist and radio presenter.

Early life
Born in Chester, Parry attended The King's School and completed his education at Trent Polytechnic (now known as Nottingham Trent University).

Journalism career
After graduating, Parry became "a Fleet Street reporter" and worked on tabloid newspapers including The Sun. In the late 1990s, he served as News Editor of the Daily Express  and then as News Editor of the Press Association. He then became a Press Officer with the Football Association.

Parry has written three books. His first was Rooney Tunes, a biography of footballer Wayne Rooney published in 2006.  He then co-wrote the autobiographies of his fellow talkSPORT presenter Alan Brazil - There's an Awful Lot of Bubbly in Brazil (2007) and Both Barrels from Brazil: My War On the Numpties (2008).

Radio
In 1999, Parry joined Talk Radio (later known as talkSPORT). He originally co-presented the Sports Breakfast with Alan Brazil, but after the onset of health problems in 2004, he was replaced by Graham Beecroft and subsequently Ronnie Irani.

Following an improvement in his health, Parry returned to co-host The Alan Brazil Sports Breakfast show on Monday and Friday mornings, and sometimes stood in for Irani if he was unavailable.  In 2009, he began presenting the 10:00–13:00 slot with Andy Townsend from Mondays to Fridays.

From June 2010, Parry began co-hosting with Mike Graham in the same slot.  They were replaced by Richard Keys and Andy Gray in February 2011.

He stood in for regular presenter Mark Chapman on 606 on Radio 5 Live on 19 February 2011 and again on 2 April 2011 alongside Robbie Savage.

Parry presented the Saturday lunchtime 'Warm-Up' show on talkSPORT from mid-2017 to August 2019. Over the course of the two years, he had various co-hosts, including Brazil, Graham, Danny Kelly and Jason Cundy. Parry left talkSPORT after 20 years in August 2019. He finished his final show by saying: "I think I'll end with words similar to those from the immortal John Lennon - 'thank you very much indeed for listening, folks, and I hope I passed the audition'". 

From 2020 to 2021 he presented weekend shows on talkRADIO.

Television
Parry started his television career as the co-presenter of the Sports Tonight Live show with Chris Cohen, broadcast on Freeview channel 112 (internet connection required) and online. Sports Tonight Live went bankrupt.

Since 2018, he has made regular guest appearances on Jeremy Vine, a topical discussion programme broadcast by Channel 5. 

During an appearance on 1 October 2021, in a debate about protests by environmental activist group Insulate Britain, he declared that ‘the problem in this country in all areas is that minorities always get the upper hand because we’re so tolerant, and minorities have to be squashed, like that… so that the rest of society can operate normally’ while slamming his hand on the desk. The incident was reported to Ofcom.

Personal life
In 2004, Parry suffered heart failure and was treated at Harefield Hospital. In the same year he was diagnosed with advanced dilated cardiomyopathy and placed on the transplant list.

Parry is a lifelong supporter of Everton Football Club and is also a minority shareholder in the club.

References

Living people
1954 births
English radio presenters
Alumni of Nottingham Trent University
People educated at The King's School, Chester
People from Chester